Michael Hartmann (born 11 July 1974) is a German football coach and a former player. He is currently the head coach for Bayern Munich U17.

Club career 
Hartmann was born in Hennigsdorf, East Germany. The midfielder played in more than 300 matches in the first three levels of the German football pyramid.

International career
Hartmann made his debut for the Germany national team on 30 April 2003 in a friendly against Serbia and Montenegro. He played in two UEFA Euro 2004 qualifiers, but was not selected for the final tournament squad.

Coaching career
After three years as head coach of the under-19 team for Hansa Rostock he was named on 10 June 2010 as assistant coach of the first team. From 2013 to 2022 Hartmann is coach for the youth ranks of one of his other former clubs as a player, Hertha BSC. In 2022 he was appointed as head coach for Bayern Munich under-17 team.

Honours
Hertha BSC
 DFB-Ligapokal: 2001, 2002

References

External links
 
 
 
 

1974 births
Living people
People from Hennigsdorf
German footballers
Germany international footballers
Bundesliga players
2. Bundesliga players
Hertha BSC players
FC Hansa Rostock players
German football managers
Association football midfielders
Footballers from Brandenburg